NF-κB inhibitor interacting Ras-like 2 is a protein that in humans is encoded by the NKIRAS2 gene.

Model organisms				

Model organisms have been used in the study of NKIRAS2 function. A conditional knockout mouse line, called Nkiras2tm1a(EUCOMM)Wtsi was generated as part of the International Knockout Mouse Consortium program — a high-throughput mutagenesis project to generate and distribute animal models of disease to interested scientists.

Male and female animals underwent a standardized phenotypic screen to determine the effects of deletion. Twenty one tests were carried out, but no significant abnormalities were observed.

References

Further reading 
 
 
 
 

Genes mutated in mice